Dejan Stanković  (born 11 September 1978) is a Serbian professional manager and former player. He currently manages Italian  club Sampdoria.

He captained the Serbia national team from 2007 until 2011, when he announced his retirement from international football.  Stanković began his career at Red Star Belgrade, before joining Lazio in 1998. He spent more than five years with the latter club before joining Inter Milan, where he remained until his retirement in 2013.

Stanković is renowned for being the only man to represent three differently named nations at FIFA World Cups – Yugoslavia, Serbia and Montenegro, and Serbia.

Club career

Red Star Belgrade
Stanković grew up in Zemun, a municipality of Belgrade. Both of his parents, Borislav and Dragica, have strong football backgrounds. Stanković began playing football for FK Teleoptik, based in his neighbourhood of Zemun. When spotted by Red Star cadet squad coach Branko Radović, however, 14-year-old Dejan transferred to Red Star Belgrade's youth system. Stanković then passed every age category at his hometown club. In the youth teams, he was coached by Vladimir Petrović, playing alongside future professionals Nikola Lazetić and Nenad Lalatović.

During the 1994–95 season, Stanković's debut opportunity for first-team action came under head coach Ljupko Petrović against crosstown rivals OFK Beograd on 11 February 1995, becoming the youngest player to debut with Red Star at senior level. Fighting for a spot on the team led by, among others, Rambo Petković, Darko Kovačević, and Nebojša Krupniković, 16-year-old Stanković made seven league appearances that season as the team won the league title. He scored his first goal against Budućnost Podgorica, becoming the youngest goalscorer in Red Star history as well as a first-team regular and a fan favourite.

During the early 1990s, Red Star was under an international ban because of a United Nations sanction imposed on FR Yugoslavia, meaning that the team could not compete in any European competition. The ban was lifted ahead of the 1995–96 season, and just a year later Stanković debuted in a European competition in two-leg victory over 1. FC Kaiserslautern in the Cup Winners' Cup.

Before the start of the 1997–98 season, he was made squad captain at the age of 19, the youngest ever in the club's history. Despite not winning the league he captained the team to two domestic cup victories.

Lazio
In the summer of 1998, Stanković transferred for ₤24 million to Lazio, where he scored on his Serie A debut versus Piacenza on 13 September 1998. In those years, Lazio had an all-star squad with world class players at almost every position, but Stanković quickly secured a regular first-team place despite competition from Pavel Nedvěd, Juan Sebastián Verón and Roberto Mancini. He formed a formidable midfield combination with Argentinian Verón and Diego Simeone and were an integral part of the successful Lazio side at the turn of the decade. His work rate and impressive performances earned him the nickname "Il Dragone" ("The Dragon"). He had five-and-a-half successful seasons in the Biancoceleste part of Rome – winning 1999–2000 Serie A, 1999–2000 Coppa Italia, 1998 and 2000 Supercoppa Italiana, 1998–99 UEFA Cup Winners' Cup, and 1999 UEFA Super Cup – before earning a high-profile move to Inter Milan in February 2004.

Inter Milan

2004–2008
Although Lazio had suffered from financial issues since 2001 and had been forced to sell some of its best players, Stanković began the 2003–04 season at Lazio. In January 2004, Juventus were favorites in the chase for the Serb's signature with even some preliminary paperwork reportedly signed between the two parties in early January 2004, but the player eventually chose Inter Milan. He was signed as part of a deal worth €4 million, that also sent Macedonian international Goran Pandev in the opposite direction.

In early February 2004, Stanković played his debut for Inter under head coach Alberto Zaccheroni, a Serie A clash at home against Siena that ended 4–0. On 21 February 2004, he scored a spectacular goal directly from a corner kick to put Inter 1–0 up in the Derby della Madonnina versus fierce rivals Milan. Inter finished the league season in fourth place thus qualifying for Champions League. Still, Inter president Massimo Moratti was not convinced with Zaccheroni who quit at the end of the season because of a feeling of distrust; Mancini, who had been rumored, was then brought in by Moratti from the financial shipwreck at Lazio. In the summer of 2004, Stanković got reunited with another familiar face from Lazio – Siniša Mihajlović.

On 7 May 2006, Stanković played his 100th match for Inter. Coming off the summer appearance at the 2006 World Cup, he carried excellent form right from the start of the 2006–07 Serie A campaign, scoring some decisive goals. His double against Catania and his memorable goal against city rivals Milan only further enhanced his central role in a team that will win the league in a record-breaking season. He renewed his contract on 2 February 2007, with Inter securing his services until at least 2010.

2008–09 season
With the June 2008 arrival of José Mourinho to replace Mancini as Inter's head coach, there was much press speculation about Stanković's exit from the Nerazzuri (along with Adriano, David Suazo and Nicolás Burdisso) being imminent, due to reportedly not being held in high regard by the newly arrived Portuguese coach as well as the strong connection the Serbian midfielder had with the previous coach. Then in late June, after reports that Stanković was told by Mourinho that he would not be allowed to show up for the pre-season training in South Tyrol, and more reports on the interest of Juventus, it seemed that Stanković was definitely on his way out. The press reports of Stanković's pending arrival to Juventus, sparked the club's fans into protests and online petitions, as they would neither forgive his turning down the club back in January 2004 nor his exuberant public celebrations after the 2005–06 Serie A title that was stripped from Juventus and handed to Inter following the Calciopoli scandal. The Juve deal fell through within days for a variety of other reasons, and Stanković was suddenly reported to be happy to stay at Inter. However, the transfer talk was temporarily reignited again by Mourinho's suggestion in mid-July 2008 that "Stanković was not the same player that he was at Lazio".

Stanković, however, remained with the club to fight for a spot on Mourinho's team. On 19 October 2008, Stanković scored a superb goal in Inter's 4–0 hammering of Luciano Spalletti's Roma away at Stadio Olimpico. After receiving a pass from Sulley Muntari, he drove the ball past the Roma goalkeeper into the net, his 24th goal in all competitions for the Nerazzuri, thus ending a year-long goal drought. In the interviews after the match, Stanković talked of his joy to be fully back on form following the injury-prone previous season, also thanking Mourinho for giving him an opportunity, even after the two did not get off on the right foot during the summer off-season. In December 2008, Stanković, by now an irreplaceable part of Mourinho's midfield, gave another display of his rediscovered form versus Chievo at home: first with a through-pass to Maxwell for the game's opening goal, followed by a goal of his own for 2–0 with a first time shot from the edge of the penalty area, and finally an assist from the right wing to Zlatan Ibrahimović as Inter recorded a 4–2 win.

On 7 February 2009, Stanković celebrated his 200th appearance for Inter in all competitions at the away game versus Lecce. Inter hammered the newly promoted team 3–0 with Stanković heading in the third goal following a slick free-kick cross from Maicon. Stanković's season-long good form continued as he scored Internazionale's second goal against Milan in the 270th Milan Derby on 15 February. This turned out to be the winning goal after Alexandre Pato had pulled one back. Inter went on to win a fourth consecutive title.

In the Champions League, Inter limped into the second round after losing their final two group stage matches against Panathinaikos and Werder Bremen. In the first elimination round (round of 16), they lost to Manchester United in a hard-fought tie. Stanković played the full 90 minutes in the first leg at San Siro, putting in a very active display. In the return at Old Trafford, Stanković started the match and had a lively first half, with two missed opportunities to score. In the 58th minute, with United leading 2–0, and Inter forced to chase the result, Mourinho took Stanković off and inserted striker Adriano.

2009–10: Triplete season

The 2009–10 season began well for Stanković. In the Milan derby on 29 August, he played in a deeper role to replace the injured Esteban Cambiasso. Nevertheless, he scored Inter's fourth goal and his second in consecutive Milan derbies in a 4–0 thrashing, a spectacular 30-yard strike after quickly collecting Sulley Muntari's pass. He subsequently scored against Rubin Kazan and Udinese to continue his rich vein of form under José Mourinho.

He also scored a wonder-goal from 54 metres out in a 5–0 thrashing against Genoa, volleying the ball straight in from Marco Amelia's clearance. At the end of the season, Stanković won an historical treble with Inter, conquering the 2009–10 Serie A, Coppa Italia, and Champions League.

2010–11 season
Playing under new head coach Rafael Benítez, Stanković continued his usual midfield role. On 28 November 2010, Stanković netted a hat-trick in an emphatic 5–2 victory over Parma at the San Siro.

At the 2010 FIFA Club World Cup in Abu Dhabi in mid December, Stanković played an excellent semi-final against Seongnam, scoring the opening goal and performing well. Despite this, however, Benítez decided to bench the midfielder for the final versus TP Mazembe, only bringing him on for Christian Chivu in the 54th minute. Benítez was soon sacked despite winning the trophy, and a couple of weeks later Stanković expressed his dismay at Spaniard's decision to leave him on the bench for the final. On the same occasion, despite publicly backing the beleaguered coach months earlier, Stanković stated that Benítez simply "didn't work" at Inter.

Under newly arrived head coach Leonardo, Stanković continued his role in midfield. Stanković scored his first goal under new coach at home versus Bologna in mid-January, and then continued with the same form away at Udinese, scoring the opening goal in a match that Inter lost 3–1. In Coppa Italia quarter-final at Napoli on 26 January, Stanković injured his thigh muscle. He returned for a Serie A match at Sampdoria on 27 February as Inter won 2–0. Inter made good recovery chasing the league-leaders AC Milan, getting within two points of them ahead of Milan derby, but lost disastrously 0–3.
 
Stanković scored a spectacular volley from the halfway line against Schalke 04 in the Champions League quarter-final first leg on 5 April 2011 as goalkeeper Manuel Neuer ran out of the box to make a daring header clearance that made it up to the halfway line, leaving an open goal as a target for Stanković's firm first-time volley. Inter, however, would lose that match 2–5 at home. On 19 April, in the Coppa Italia semi-final first leg, Stanković scored the winning goal with another spectacular long-range effort, hitting a sweet outside foot volley past the despairing dive of the goalkeeper. Stanković played the full 90 in the 2011 Coppa Italia Final, winning his last trophy with Inter.

Retirement
Stanković played two additional seasons at Inter without reaching the same heights. On 6 July 2013, he announced his goodbye to Inter fans via a letter published on the club's official website. He made a total of 326 appearances with Inter, scoring 42 goals. In 2019, he was inducted into Inter Milan Hall of Fame.

International career
Stanković made his international debut for the FR Yugoslavia team against South Korea on 22 April 1998, scoring two goals in a 6–1 victory. He represented the FR Yugoslavia national team at the 1998 World Cup and Euro 2000, soon establishing himself as an important player.

The Yugoslav team was renamed Serbia and Montenegro by the time 2006 World Cup qualifying started. Stanković played all games but last one, scoring two goals. At the 2006 FIFA World Cup, he was given the number 10 shirt and Savo Milošević captained the new Serbia and Montenegro team in their first World Cup, but they failed to progress to the knock-out rounds after losing all their group matches to the Ivory Coast, Argentina and the Netherlands. After Milošević retired, the midfielder took over as captain of the re-formed Serbia national team, following the breakup of Serbia and Montenegro.

He was silver medalist at the 2009 Cyprus International Football Tournament. In the 2010 World Cup qualifying, Stanković started in and captained all but two of Serbia's matches. They qualified for their first World Cup as an independent nation. 

In June 2010, he was selected in Serbia's squad for the 2010 FIFA World Cup,  where he played every minute in group stage. He was instrumental in their shock 1–0 win over favorites Germany, but they were not able to progress to the next round due to narrow losses against Ghana and Australia.

After captaining the team in a 1–0 loss in the final game of the UEFA Euro 2012 qualifying phase against Slovenia, Stanković announced his retirement from international football after 13 years since his debut against South Korea in 1998. He played a testimonial match two years later, becoming the most capped player in the history of Serbia (103), playing one more match than Savo Milošević. The match was played against Japan, in which he played until the tenth minute, making room for Ivan Radovanović. He received a standing ovation as he said his final goodbye to football. Serbia went on to win the match 2–0.

Style of play
A talented player, Stanković usually played as an attacking midfielder, although he was a versatile player who was capable of operating in many different positions, and made a name for himself as a player who could also play out wide on the wings or track back in a defensive midfield role. A tenacious and hard-working player, "Deki", as he is nicknamed, was best known for his efficient, accurate passing, versatility and creativity, as well as his ability to score goals, in particular from long distance; he was also effective in the air, and was known for his pace, skill, and influence on the pitch.

Managerial career

Red Star Belgrade
On 21 December 2019, Stanković was appointed as the manager of Serbian SuperLiga club Red Star Belgrade on a two-and-a-half-year contract. The club won the 2019–20 Serbian SuperLiga, Stankovic's first trophy as a manager, 14 points clear of city rivals Partizan.

In 2020–21, Red Star Belgrade went unbeaten through the whole league season, winning 35 of 38 fixtures, while scoring a record-breaking 114 goals. On 25 May, the club also won the Serbian Cup through a 4–3 win on penalties (0–0 after full time) against Partizan in the final. Together with Hoffenheim, they advanced through the group stage of the 2020–21 UEFA Europa League, eliminating Slovan Liberec and Gent in the process. The club was knocked out in the round of 32 by Italian club Milan on away goals after the tie ended 3–3 on aggregate.

On 26 August 2022, Stanković resigned as Red Star manager after being eliminated by Maccabi Haifa in the 2022–23 UEFA Champions League qualification playoff round.

Sampdoria
On 6 October 2022, Stanković signed a contract until the end of the season with struggling Serie A club Sampdoria.

Personal life
Stanković was born in Belgrade, present day Serbia, to Bora and Dragica and has a brother Siniša. He is married to Ana Ačimovič, whom he met at the age of 19, and who is a sister of former professional footballer Milenko Ačimovič, Stanković's former teammate at Red Star. The pair has three sons; Stefan (b. 2000), Filip (b. 2002) and Aleksandar (b. 2005), and the family resides in Milan. All of his three sons were members of Inter Milan football academy.

Stanković and his family spend much of their free time in the Slovenian capital Ljubljana, the birthplace of his wife and residence of his brother-in-law Milenko. As of February 2014, Stanković played amateur football for veteran's club KMN Olimpija Ljubljana, where he played alongside his brother in law and a number of former professional footballers (e.g. Sebastjan Cimirotič, Ermin Rakovič, and Igor Lazič).

Career statistics

Club

International

Scores and results list FR Yugoslavia/Serbia's goal tally first, score column indicates score after each Stanković goal.

Managerial statistics

Honours

Player
Red Star Belgrade 
Yugoslav First League: 1994–95
Yugoslav Cup: 1994–95, 1995–96, 1996–97

Lazio
Serie A: 1999–2000
Coppa Italia: 1999–2000, 2003–04
Supercoppa Italiana: 1998, 2000
Cup Winners' Cup: 1998–99
UEFA Super Cup: 1999

Inter Milan
Serie A: 2005–06, 2006–07, 2007–08, 2008–09, 2009–10
Coppa Italia: 2004–05, 2005–06, 2009–10, 2010–11
Supercoppa Italiana: 2005, 2006, 2008, 2010
UEFA Champions League: 2009–10
FIFA Club World Cup: 2010

Individual
ESM Team of the Season: 2006–07
Serbian Player of the Year: 2006, 2010
Inter Milan Hall of Fame: 2019

Manager
Red Star Belgrade
Serbian SuperLiga: 2019–20, 2020–21, 2021–22
Serbian Cup: 2020–21, 2021–22

See also
 List of footballers with 100 or more caps

References

External links

 Dejan Stanković at Reprezentacija.rs
Dejan Stanković at Inter.it
Dejan Stanković at Eurosport.com

 
 

1978 births
Living people
Yugoslav footballers
Serbian footballers
Yugoslavia international footballers
Serbia and Montenegro international footballers
Serbia international footballers
Association football midfielders
Red Star Belgrade footballers
S.S. Lazio players
Inter Milan players
Serie A players
1998 FIFA World Cup players
UEFA Euro 2000 players
2006 FIFA World Cup players
2010 FIFA World Cup players
FIFA Century Club
Serbia and Montenegro expatriate sportspeople in Italy
Expatriate footballers in Italy
Serbia and Montenegro expatriate footballers
Serbia and Montenegro footballers
Footballers from Belgrade
UEFA Champions League winning players
Serbian football managers
Serbian SuperLiga managers
Serie A managers
Red Star Belgrade managers
U.C. Sampdoria managers